The 2019 Braidy Industries Women's Tennis Classic was a professional tennis tournament played on outdoor hard courts. It was the seventh edition of the tournament which was part of the 2019 ITF Women's World Tennis Tour. It took place in Ashland, United States between 22 and 28 July 2019.

Singles main-draw entrants

Seeds

 1 Rankings are as of 15 July 2019.

Other entrants
The following players received wildcards into the singles main draw:
  Hayley Carter
  Victoria Duval
  Jennifer Elie
  Peyton Stearns

The following players received entry from the qualifying draw:
  Fatma Al-Nabhani
  Vladica Babić
  Hanna Chang
  Alexa Glatch
  Lorraine Guillermo
  Abbie Myers
  Anastasia Nefedova
  Ayaka Okuno

The following player received entry as a Lucky Loser:
  Angelina Gabueva

Champions

Singles

 Ellen Perez def.  Zoe Hives, 6–2, 3–2, ret.

Doubles

 Sanaz Marand /  Caitlin Whoriskey def.  Vladica Babić /  Julia Rosenqvist, 7–6(7–4), 6–4

References

External links
 2019 Braidy Industries Women's Tennis Classic at ITFtennis.com
 Official website

2019 ITF Women's World Tennis Tour
2019 in American tennis
Tennis in Kentucky